Fouladpur, the village of villages it also spelt Phouladpur, is a village in the Alwar district of Rajasthan, India. It is very good place to visit. Here some ancient fort also. This village has a very important role in Rajasthan politics. On an average this village is rich as compared to others.

References

Villages in Alwar district